France competed at the 2019 Summer Universiade in Naples, Italy held from 3 to 14 July 2019.

Medal summary

Medal by sports

Medalists

Competitors 
The following is a list of the number of competitors who participated in the Universiade.

Archery 

Men

Women

Mixed team

Athletics 

France qualified 16 athletics for the Athletics events at the 2019 Summer Universiade including 8 men and 8 women. 

 Key

 Note–Ranks given for track events are within the athlete's heat only
 Q = Qualified for the next round
 q = Qualified for the next round as a fastest loser or, in field events, by position without achieving the qualifying target
 NR = National record
 SB = Season best
 PB = Personal best
 N/A = Round not applicable for the event
 Bye = Athlete not required to compete in round

 Track & road events
 Men

 Women

 Field events
 Men

 Women

Combined events – Women's heptathlon

Swimming 

Men

Women

References

External links 
 Official website

Nations at the 2019 Summer Universiade
Summer U
2019